The men's long jump at the 2008 Olympic Games took place on 16 and 18 August at the Beijing Olympic Stadium. Thirty-eight athletes from 32 nations competed. The event was won by Irving Saladino of Panama, the nation's first Olympic gold medal in any event and its first medal the men's long jump. South Africa also won its first men's long jump medal, with Khotso Mokoena's silver. Ibrahim Camejo's bronze was Cuba's first medal in the event since 2000. This event marked the first time that an American did not classify to the final phase in a non-boycotted Olympic competition.

Background

This was the 26th appearance of the event, which is one of 12 athletics events to have been held at every Summer Olympics. The returning finalists from the 2004 Games were fifth-place finisher Chris Tomlinson of Great Britain and twelfth-place finisher Salim Sdiri of France. Dwight Phillips, the reigning gold medalist who had won two world championships (2003, 2005) and would win two more later (2009, 2011) and finished third at the most recent championships, placed fourth in the U.S. Olympic trials and missed the team. The reigning world champion, Irving Saladino of Panama, was the favorite in Beijing.

Bermuda made its first appearance in the event. The United States appeared for the 25th time, most of any nation, having missed only the boycotted 1980 Games.

Qualification

The qualifying standards were 8.20 m (26.9 ft) (A standard) and 8.05 m (26.41 ft) (B standard). Each National Olympic Committee (NOC) was able to enter up to three entrants providing they had met the A qualifying standard in the qualifying period (1 January 2007 to 23 July 2008). NOCs were also permitted to enter one athlete providing he had met the B standard in the same qualifying period. The maximum number of athletes per nation had been set at 3 since the 1930 Olympic Congress.

Competition format

The 2008 competition used the two-round format with divided final introduced in 1952. The qualifying round gave each competitor three jumps to achieve a distance of 8.15 metres; if fewer than 12 men did so, the top 12 (including all those tied) would advance. The final provided each jumper with three jumps; the top eight jumpers received an additional three jumps for a total of six, with the best to count (qualifying round jumps were not considered for the final).

Records

Prior to this competition, the existing world and Olympic records were as follows.

No new world or Olympic records were set for this event.

Schedule

All times are China Standard Time (UTC+8)

Results

Qualifying

Qualifying Performance 8.15 (Q) or at least 12 best performers (q) advance to the Final.

Final
The final was held on 18 August 2008. Martínez was disqualified.

References

Athletics at the 2008 Summer Olympics
Long jump at the Olympics
Men's events at the 2008 Summer Olympics